Capela is a municipality located in the Brazilian state of Sergipe. As of the 2020 IBGE estimate, there were 34,514 people living there and its area is 441 km2.

References

Municipalities in Sergipe